Enveloping algebra in mathematics may refer to:

 The universal enveloping algebra of a Lie algebra
 The associative enveloping algebra of a general non-associative algebra
 The enveloping algebra of an associative algebra: see Associative_algebra#Enveloping_algebra
 The enveloping von Neumann algebra of a C*-algebra